USS King (DL-10/DLG-10/DDG-41) was a  guided missile destroyer in the United States Navy. She was named for Fleet Admiral Ernest Joseph King (1878–1956),

King was laid down by the Puget Sound Navy Yard at Bremerton in Washington on 1 March 1957, launched on 6 December 1958 and commissioned on 17 November 1960.

King was reclassified as a guided missile destroyer leader on 14 November 1956 and designated DLG-10. King was again reclassified as a guided missile destroyer on 30 June 1975 and designated DDG-41.

Service history 
After shakedown along the coast, and in Hawaiian waters, King continued training out of San Diego for the remainder of 1961. Following extensive preparations the guided-missile frigate sailed on her first WestPac cruise, 7 June 1962, strengthening the 7th Fleet with her Terrier missile arsenal. Operating with this peacekeeping force, King helped to check Communist aggression in Southeast Asia.

Upon returning San Diego on 31 December, she resumed tactical exercises off the West Coast until 1 August 1963 when she departed on her second WestPac cruise. Once again her operations with the 7th Fleet helped maintain stability in the Far East. King returned San Diego 10 March 1964 and conducted operations along the coast, for the rest of the year constantly perfecting her fighting skills and increasing the peacekeeping ability of the Navy.

King headed back for the Far East 5 April 1965 escorting the aircraft carrier . She operated from the South China Sea during May screening carriers and participating in air-sea rescue work. She continued to serve off Vietnam until returning to San Diego on 2 November.

The guided missile destroyer operated off the West Coast until heading back for the Western Pacific 26 May 1966. On this cruise she carried a helicopter for search and rescue missions to save American pilots during strikes against North Vietnam. She arrived at Da Nang, South Vietnam, on 27 June. During July she saved five downed aviators, including one who was rescued from deep within North Vietnam by the ship's helicopter crew. In August the ship was stationed in a positive identification and radar advisory zone (PIRAZ) in the Gulf of Tonkin to help protect American ships from enemy aircraft. Before she was relieved, she had checked over 15,000 aircraft. During this duty she also rescued seven pilots whose planes had gone down during strikes against enemy targets.

A fourth crew member was also washed overboard, but was rescued.

She won the 1982 Marjorie Sterrett Battleship Fund Award for the Atlantic Fleet.

King was sold on 15 April 1994, and broken up for scrap by J&L Metals, Wilmington, North Carolina during 1995.

References

External links
 USS King official website
 USS King (DLG-10/DDG-41) Association Wiki
  Naval History: USS King (DL-10 / DLG-10 / DDG-41)

 

Farragut-class destroyers (1958)
Cold War destroyers of the United States
1958 ships